David Quijano Garcia (born 7 October 1986) is a Puerto Rican former professional boxer who competed from 2006 to 2016 and challenged for the WBO super flyweight title in 2012.

Professional career 
Quijano challenged Omar Narváez for the WBO super flyweight title on 15 December 2012, but was defeated by unanimous decision (UD).

Professional boxing record 

{|class="wikitable" style="text-align:center"
|-
!
!Result
!Record
!Opponent
!Type
!Round, time
!Date
!Location
!Notes
|-
|24
|Loss
|16–7–1
|style="text-align:left;"|Ricardo Rodriguez
|UD
|10
|14 Oct 2016
|style="text-align:left;"|
|style="text-align:left;"|
|-
|23
|Loss
|16–6–1
|style="text-align:left;"|Ricardo Rodriguez
|UD
|10
|24 Jun 2016
|style="text-align:left;"|
|style="text-align:left;"|
|-
|22
|Win
|16–5–1
|style="text-align:left;"|Daniel Lozano
|UD
|10
|23 Oct 2015
|style="text-align:left;"|
|style="text-align:left;"|
|-
|21
|Loss
|15–5–1
|style="text-align:left;"|McJoe Arroyo
|UD
|8
|28 Apr 2014
|style="text-align:left;"|
|
|-
|20
|Loss
|15–4–1
|style="text-align:left;"|Emmanuel Rodríguez
|UD
|8
|21 Dec 2013
|style="text-align:left;"|
|
|-
|19
|Loss
|15–3–1
|style="text-align:left;"|Omar Narváez
|UD
|12
|15 Dec 2012
|style="text-align:left;"|
|style="text-align:left;"|
|-
|18
|Win
|15–2–1
|style="text-align:left;"|Juanito Rubillar
|
|10 (12), 
|15 Jun 2012
|style="text-align:left;"|
|style="text-align:left;"|
|-
|17
|Win
|14–2–1
|style="text-align:left;"|Javier Gallo
|UD
|10
|21 Jan 2012
|style="text-align:left;"|
|
|-
|16
|Loss
|13–2–1
|style="text-align:left;"|Juan Mercedes
|UD
|10
|1 Apr 2011
|style="text-align:left;"|
|style="text-align:left;"|
|-
|15
|Win
|13–1–1
|style="text-align:left;"|Antwan Robertson
|TKO
|3 (6), 
|5 Feb 2011
|style="text-align:left;"|
|
|-
|14
|Win
|12–1–1
|style="text-align:left;"|Luis Angel Paneto
|KO
|4 (8), 
|26 Mar 2010
|style="text-align:left;"|
|
|-
|13
|Win
|11–1–1
|style="text-align:left;"|Miguel Robles
|SD
|8
|30 Oct 2009
|style="text-align:left;"|
|style="text-align:left;"|
|-
|12
|Win
|10–1–1
|style="text-align:left;"|Angel Lopez
|TKO
|2 (6), 
|12 Sep 2009
|style="text-align:left;"|
|
|-
|11
|Win
|9–1–1
|style="text-align:left;"|Jesús Martínez
|UD
|8
|25 Apr 2009
|style="text-align:left;"|
|
|-
|10
|Win
|8–1–1
|style="text-align:left;"|Francisco Dominguez
|TKO
|6 (6), 
|30 Aug 2008
|style="text-align:left;"|
|
|-
|9
|Win
|7–1–1
|style="text-align:left;"|Sammir Garcia
|TKO
|1 (4), 
|25 Apr 2008
|style="text-align:left;"|
|
|-
|8
|Win
|6–1–1
|style="text-align:left;"|Luis Miguel Ortiz
|
|6
|23 Feb 2008
|style="text-align:left;"|
|
|-
|7
|Win
|5–1–1
|style="text-align:left;"|Luis Miguel Ortiz
|UD
|6
|22 Jun 2007
|style="text-align:left;"|
|
|-
|6
|Loss
|4–1–1
|style="text-align:left;"|Freddy Canate
|
|4
|28 Apr 2007
|style="text-align:left;"|
|
|-
|5
|Win
|4–0–1
|style="text-align:left;"|Ricardo Blackman
|TKO
|2 (6), 
|2 Feb 2007
|style="text-align:left;"|
|
|-
|4
|Draw
|3–0–1
|style="text-align:left;"|Jose Gonzalez
|
|4
|17 Nov 2006
|style="text-align:left;"|
|
|-
|3
|Win
|3–0
|style="text-align:left;"|Christopher Sanchez
|TKO
|1 (4), 
|30 Sep 2006
|style="text-align:left;"|
|
|-
|2
|Win
|2–0
|style="text-align:left;"|Felix Nazario
|
|1 (4), 
|29 Apr 2006
|style="text-align:left;"|
|
|-
|1
|Win
|1–0
|style="text-align:left;"|Jesus Del Valle
|
|1 (4)
|3 Feb 2006
|style="text-align:left;"|
|

References

External links 
 

1986 births
Living people
Super-flyweight boxers
Puerto Rican male boxers
21st-century Puerto Rican people